Alexey Labzin (born 7 December 1978) is a Paralympian athlete from Russia competing mainly in category T13 sprint. He won two gold and three silver medals in 100–400 m events at the 2008 and 2012 Summer Paralympics.

Labzin is married and has two sons. He was born and raised in Vidim, Irkutsk Oblast, but after the death of his coach moved to Ufa.

References

External links

 

1978 births
Living people
Paralympic athletes of Russia
Athletes (track and field) at the 2008 Summer Paralympics
Paralympic silver medalists for Russia
Paralympic gold medalists for Russia
Medalists at the 2008 Summer Paralympics
Athletes (track and field) at the 2012 Summer Paralympics
Medalists at the 2012 Summer Paralympics
Paralympic medalists in athletics (track and field)
Sportspeople from Irkutsk Oblast